Hunter Luke Harvey (born December 9, 1994) is an American professional baseball pitcher for the Washington Nationals of Major League Baseball (MLB). The Baltimore Orioles selected him with the 22nd pick in the first round of the 2013 Major League Baseball draft. He made his MLB debut in 2019 with the Baltimore Orioles.

Career

Baltimore Orioles
Harvey attended Bandys High School in Catawba, North Carolina. The Baltimore Orioles selected him in the first round of the 2013 Major League Baseball draft. He signed with the Orioles on June 20, 2013, and made his professional debut that season for the Gulf Coast Orioles of the Rookie-level Gulf Coast League. In August he was promoted to the Aberdeen IronBirds of the Class A-Short Season New York-Penn League. Overall, he started eight games, pitching to a 0–1 win–loss record with a 1.78 earned run average (ERA) with 33 strikeouts in  innings pitched.

Prior to the 2014 season, Harvey was ranked by Baseball Prospectus as the 58th-best prospect in baseball. He spent the season with the Delmarva Shorebirds of the Class A South Atlantic League where at 19 years of age he pitched to a 7-5 record and 3.18 ERA in 17 starts covering 87.2 innings. His 10.9 strikeouts per 9 innings were tops in the league of all pitchers who had pitched 70 or more innings. He was named an SAL mid-season All Star and an MiLB Organization All Star.

He did not pitch in 2015 or 2016. On May 12, 2015, Harvey was shut down for six weeks due to tightness in his elbow. He did not pitch for a minor league team in 2015. Harvey threw in an instructional league in September 2015. He began the 2016 season on the disabled list, and then underwent Tommy John surgery in July which ended his season.

In 2017, Harvey pitched for Aberdeen and Delmarva, along with three rehab games with the Gulf Coast Orioles, pitching to an 0–1 record and 0.96 ERA with 30 strikeouts in  total innings pitched between the three teams (14.5 strikeouts per 9 innings).

The Orioles added Harvey to their 40-man roster after the 2017 season. They assigned him to the Bowie Baysox of the Class AA Eastern League to begin the 2018 season, but promoted him to the major leagues on April 9, to provide a fresh player for the relief corps. However, he did not make his major league debut and was optioned back to Bowie two days later, and spent the remainder of the year there. In nine starts, he compiled a 1–2 record with a 5.57 ERA in 32.1 innings.

On August 17, 2019, Harvey was promoted to the major leagues. He made his major league debut that night versus the Boston Red Sox, striking out two batters over one scoreless inning. He was credited with his first major-league win in a 4–1 victory over the Kansas City Royals in his Camden Yards debut three nights later on August 20. After he kept the game tied at 1–1 by retiring all three batters he faced in his only inning of work, Hanser Alberto's three run homer in the bottom of the eighth gave the Orioles its eventual winning margin. In 2019 in the minor leagues he was 3-6 with one save and a 5.00 ERA in 75.2 innings in which he struck out 83 batters. With the Orioles, he was 1-2 with a 1.40 ERA in seven relief appearances covering 6.1 innings in which he struck out 11 batters.

In 2020 for the Orioles, Harvey was 0-2 and pitched to a 4.15 ERA with 6 strikeouts in 8.2 innings pitched in 10 games.

On March 16, 2021, Harvey was placed on the 60-day injured list with an oblique strain. He was activated off of the injured list on June 4. Harvey was placed back on the injured list on July 2 with a right lat strain. In AAA, he was 2-1 with an 8.10 ERA in 10 innings. With the Orioles, he was 0-0 with a 4.15 ERA in nine relief appearances covering 8.2 innings.

San Francisco Giants
On November 5, 2021, Harvey was claimed off waivers by the San Francisco Giants. He was designated for assignment on March 14, 2022, to create room on the roster for free agent signing Jakob Junis.

Washington Nationals
On March 21, 2022, Harvey was claimed off of waivers by the Washington Nationals. Harvey was placed on the injured list on April 21 with a right forearm strain, later being transferred to the 60-day IL on June 14.

Personal
Harvey is the son of former Major League Baseball pitcher Bryan Harvey. His brother Kris Harvey played in Minor League Baseball from 2005 to 2012.

References

External links

1994 births
Living people
People from Catawba, North Carolina
Baseball players from North Carolina
Major League Baseball pitchers
Baltimore Orioles players
Washington Nationals players
Gulf Coast Orioles players
Aberdeen IronBirds players
Delmarva Shorebirds players
Bowie Baysox players
Norfolk Tides players